Chippewa High School is a public high school in Doylestown, Ohio.  It is the only high school in the Chippewa Local Schools district.  Their nickname is the Chipps.

History
The school was known as Doylestown High School after the Doylestown and Chippewa Township districts merged in 1917, until 1971 when the new high school was built.  The name change reflected the trend that most of the district's residents lived within Chippewa Township and not within Doylestown's limits. This is also when they shortened their nickname to the "Chipps", as they felt it was redundant to call themselves the "Chippewa Chippewas". Despite this, many locals still refer to the school as "Doylestown High."

Chippewa's football rivalry with the Rittman High School Indians is the longest-running uninterrupted rivalry in Wayne County, having met every year since 1923. The two rival high schools compete for the "Big Chief Trophy.". Their football rivalry with Dalton High School Bulldogs is the second-longest in the county and has been played every year since 1925 with the exception of three years in the 1940s when Dalton didn't field a team.

Chippewa is one of eight schools that participate in the Wayne County Athletic League.

Ohio High School Athletic Association State Championships

 Girls Track and Field – 1975

Ohio High School Athletic Association State Runnerups
 Girls Basketball-1994 
 Girls Soccer – 2005, 2015

Notable alumni
 Denny Galehouse (MLB Pitcher)
 Wayne M Adams (England International)

References

External links
 District Website

High schools in Wayne County, Ohio
Public high schools in Ohio